As of 2015, Fijian had at least two translations available of the Tirukkural.

History of translations
There are at least two translations known of the Kural text in the Fijian language. The first one was by Samuel L. Berwick who translated it in 1964 under the title Na Tirukurala published in Nadi, Fiji. The second one was by Paul Geraghty published under the title Tirukurali Na sere tabu in 2008.

Translations

Published translations

See also
 Tirukkural translations
 List of Tirukkural translations by language

References

External links
 

Fijian
Translations into Fijian